Aroche is a municipality of Spain located in the province of Huelva, Andalusia. According to the 2005 census, the town had a population of 3,319.

History 
Similarly to Moura and Serpa, Aroche and Aracena may have been conquered by the Order of the Hospital and incorporated to the Kingdom of Portugal during the reign of Sancho II, circa 1230–1233, although it has been suggested the Christian occupation may have had to wait to the void of Muslim power in the area caused by the Fall of Seville in the late 1240s. The area, occupied by Afonso III of Portugal by 1251, was theoretically granted together with Aracena to the Crown of Castile in 1253, although the effective and definitive transfer happened in 1267 as settled in Treaty of Badajoz. In fact, Afonso III granted Aroche a fuero in 1255.

Demographics

Gallery

References
Citations

Bibliography

External links
Aroche - Sistema de Información Multiterritorial de Andalucía

Municipalities in the Province of Huelva